A Rollin film, named after Bernard V. Rollin, is a 30 nm-thick liquid film of helium in the helium II state.  It exhibits a "creeping" effect in response to surfaces extending past the film's level (wave propagation).  Helium II can escape from any non-closed container via creeping toward and eventually evaporating from capillaries of 10−7 to 10−8 meters or greater.

Rollin films are involved in the fountain effect where superfluid helium leaks out of a container in a fountain-like manner.  They have high thermal conductivity.  

The ability of superfluid liquids to cross obstacles that lie at a higher level is often referred to as the Onnes effect, named after Heike Kamerlingh Onnes. The Onnes effect is enabled by the capillary forces dominating gravity and viscous forces.

Waves propagating across a Rollin film are governed by the same equation as gravity waves in shallow water, but rather than gravity, the restoring force is the van der Waals force. The film suffers a change in chemical potential when the thickness varies. These waves are known as third sound.

Thickness of the film
The thickness of the film can be calculated by the energy balance. Consider a small fluid volume element  which is located at a height  from the free surface. Minimizing the total energy with respect to the thickness provides us the value of the thickness:

See also
Second sound

References

External links
 Video of the property in action
 Video: Liquid Helium,Superfluid: demonstrating Lambda point transition/viscosity paradox/two fluid model/fountain effect/Rollin film/second sound (Alfred Leitner, 1963, 38 min.)

Helium
Bose–Einstein condensates
Fluid mechanics
Superfluidity

de:Rollin-Film